Radial spoke head 1 homolog (RSPH1), also known as cancer/testis antigen 79 (CT79) or testis-specific gene A2 protein (TSGA2), is a protein that in humans is encoded by the RSPH1 gene.

Clinical significance 
Mutations in RSPH1 are associated to Primary ciliary dyskinesia.

References

Further reading